The siege of Cuddalore was a siege attempt by British troops against a combined French and Mysorean garrison at the fortress of Cuddalore in the Second Anglo-Mysore War. The siege ended when news arrived of a preliminary peace treaty between France and Britain.

Siege

British troops were under the command of Major-General James Stuart and arrived outside Cuddalore on 7 June 1783. This army consisted of the 73rd and 78th Highlanders, the 101st regiment, and a considerable body of Sepoys. It was subsequently reinforced by a detachment of two Hanoverian regiments from the King's German possessions, commanded by Colonel Christoph August von Wangenheim.

On 6 June, the army took up a position on the sandy ground two miles from the garrison. They were between the sea on the right and the Bandipollum hills on the left, with a reserve line in the rear. The French and Mysoreans, commanded by Marquis de Bussy-Castelnau, took an intermediate and parallel position half a mile (0.8 km) in front of the fort.

Attack on the redoubt

On 13 June, Stuart decided to attack the redoubt in front of the fort in order to press the allies harder within Cuddalore itself. The assault took place at four in the morning, granting the British army an element of surprise. Eventually, the allies were driven from their principal defences and the last allied counterattack was defeated. By mutual consent, a cessation of firing took place. The allies suffered serious losses of nearly 500 casualties. Stuart's forces also suffered heavily: more than 900 British, Hanoverian, and Sepoys were killed or wounded. Though significantly weakened, Stuart continued to besiege Cuddalore proper and prepared for further reinforcements from the sea.

Naval Battle

Key naval support for the British was interrupted on 20 June by the arrival of a French fleet under the Bailli de Suffren, which met the British fleet in a naval battle and forced it to withdraw to Madras. Suffren, with this advantage, was able to land 2,400 soldiers, marines, and sailors in support of de Bussy's garrison, resulting in nearly equal-sized forces.

Repulse of the French sortie

De Bussy's additional reinforcements now had enough men to launch a sortie on the British siege works. Stuart, aware of the newly arrived French reinforcements, prepared for a major attack. On 25 June, the French made repeated sallies on the British lines. Despite some initial progress, the French were not able to press their advantage; Stuart was able to counterattack and repel the remaining French assaults. De Bussy called off the attack after realising no progress had been made at a considerable cost. The assault was a disaster, and De Bussy had lost a great opportunity in defeating the besiegers, especially with the reinforcements he had received. French morale plummeted as they had lost the advantage in numbers and the balance had swung back in favour of the besieging British. The British had no more than 23 men killed and wounded, while De Bussy's attacking force had 450 killed and wounded with another 150 taken prisoner. A number of French officers were captured including the leader of the assault, the Chevalier de Dumas, who was captured unwounded. Among the French prisoners was a young sergeant in the French marines who was also wounded and had landed from Suffren's squadron on 20 June; Jean Bernadotte became a Marshal of France and, more famously, was later crowned the King of Sweden.

End of the siege

The siege continued for another five days. Both sides were weakening from disease and growing casualties, but Stuart's forces suffered more heavily than De Bussy's. Stuart wrote letters to the Madras government asserting that he had been abandoned. De Bussy planned another attack by a more circuitous route directed at the main camp of the British forces, but this attack was not carried out before a British frigate arrived on 30 June with news of a preliminary peace between France and Britain.

Aftermath

On 2 July, Britain and France negotiated a cessation of hostilities, although the war between Mysore and Britain remained ongoing. In the Peace of Paris (1783), Cuddalore was returned to Great Britain in exchange for Pondicherry and Mahé, two French territories that British forces had captured earlier in the war. Fighting continued between the British and Mysoreans until the Treaty of Mangalore was signed in March 1784.

Notes

References

 

Sieges involving Great Britain
Sieges involving the Kingdom of Mysore
Battles involving Hanover
Sieges involving France
Conflicts in 1783
1783 in India
Sieges involving the British East India Company
Sieges of the Anglo-French War (1778–1783)
Battles of the Second Anglo-Mysore War
History of Tamil Nadu